Mwami is a town in the Eastern Province of Zambia. The town lies at the international border with Malawi, adjacent to the Malawian city of Mchinji.

Location
The town lies in Chipata District, Eastern Province, at the border with Malawi.

The geographical coordinates of Mwami, Zambia are:13°48'30.0"S, 32°45'19.0"E (Latitude:-13.808333; Longitude:32.755278).

Overview
Due to the proximity of Mwami, Zambia with Lilongwe, Malawi, most of the imports and exports handled at this border post are either destined or coming from the Mozambican port of Nacala, on the Indian Ocean coast. The majority of imports are destined to Chipata and neighboring districts.

Population
The population of Mwami was estimated at 1,760 in 2015, of whom 1,560 were residents and 200 were transients. By 2023, the town's total population, including transients, is expected to have increased to 2,266, as illustrated in the table below.

Water supply
A study carried out in 2015, observed that the town lacked a public piped water supply system and a public sewerage system. In addition, there were no public toilets in the town. The study determined that it would cost £300,735 to establish a public piped water and sewerage system in Mwami, Zambia.

One stop border crossing
The Malawi Revenue Authority indicated in May 2020, that the one-stop-border post (OSP), under construction at Mchinji would be completed by December 2020. The OSP will benefit Mwami, Zambia and Mchinji, Malawi crossings. It was built with US$5.8 million, borrowed from the African Development Bank.

Health
Mwami is the location of Mwami Adventist Hospital, a 210-bed general hospital with an attached 50-bed extended care facility, owned and administered by the Adventist Church.

See also
 Southern African Development Community
 Economy of Zambia

References

External links
 "Mwami Border Construction Works Impress Govt" As of 18 December 2019.

Chipata District
Populated places in Eastern Province, Zambia
Malawi–Zambia border crossings